Fear Feasa Ó'n Cháinte, Irish poet, fl. 16th century.

Native of Munster, and a member of the Ó an Cháintighe bardic family. His known poems include the following:

 A shaoghail ón a shaoghail
 Bean dá chumhadh críoch Ealla
 Gluais a litir go Lunndain

He is thought to have been related to Tadhg Olltach Ó an Cháinte.

External links
http://celt.ucc.ie/itbardic.html#tadhgog

16th-century Irish writers
People of Elizabethan Ireland
People from County Cork
Irish poets
Irish-language poets
Medieval Irish writers
16th-century Irish poets